Martin Konungsfrænd, also known as Martin of Kinsarvik), was a liegeman, councilor, and kinsman of king Haakon IV of Norway. He held Kinsarvik as a fief from the king. In 1219 he was one of the king's councilors who was uneasy about Earl Skule Bårdsson. Along with the other councillors he sent word to Arnbjorn Jonson and several others expressing their concerns about Skule. In 1223 he is listed first among the kings councillors in Bergen.

References

Norwegian royalty